Sibirka is a rural locality (a selo) in Kuchuksky Selsoviet, Shelabolikhinsky District, Altai Krai, Russia. The population was 71 as of 2013. There is 1 street.

Geography 
Sibirka is located on the Ob River, 17 km northwest of Shelabolikha (the district's administrative centre) by road. Kuchuk is the nearest rural locality.

References 

Rural localities in Shelabolikhinsky District